Antandrokomby is a city in Anosibe An'ala District, Alaotra-Mangoro Region, Madagascar.

References

Populated places in Alaotra-Mangoro